The Donggang River is a river in Taiwan. It flows through Pingtung County for 44 km.

Bridges
 Jinde Bridge

See also
List of rivers in Taiwan

References

Rivers of Taiwan
Landforms of Pingtung County